Fergus Henderson  (born 31 July 1963) is an English chef who founded the restaurant St John on St John Street in London. He is often noted for his use of offal and other neglected cuts of meat as a consequence of his philosophy of nose to tail eating.  Following in the footsteps of his parents, Brian and Elizabeth Henderson, he trained as an architect at the Architectural Association in London. Most of his dishes are derived from traditional British cuisine and the wines are all French.

Chefs Anthony Bourdain and Mario Batali have both praised Henderson for his dishes, which optimise British food while making full use of the whole animal. The critic A. A. Gill retracted his initial hostility to St John in the Sunday Times.

Fergus is married to fellow chef Margot Henderson; the couple have three children.

Career 
Henderson had no formal training in cooking, and has never worked under any other chef. In 1992 Henderson and his wife, Margot, opened the French House Dining Room at Soho's French House pub before he left to open the St. John restaurant in 1994. The menu at St. John changes daily, but almost always includes roast bone marrow and parsley salad. It was awarded a Michelin star in 2009.

In 2003 he opened St John Bread and Wine in Spitalfields, London. A second St John restaurant located within the hotel in Chinatown was awarded a Michelin star in 2009. This venue is no longer open.

Nose to Tail Books 
In 1999 Henderson published Nose to Tail Eating: A Kind of British Cooking in which he provides recipes incorporating trotters, tripe, kidneys, chitterlings and other animal parts. The book explains the philosophy behind his cooking explaining that "it seems common sense and even polite to the animal to use all of it. Rather than being testosterone-fuelled blood-lust, it actually seems to be a gentle approach to meat eating." In 2007, he published a sequel, Beyond Nose To Tail, and in 2012 The Complete Nose to Tail: A Kind of British Cooking.

Hotel 
Henderson opened a hotel in spring 2011 that was described by his business partner Trevor Gulliver as being 'in the St John vernacular'. It was located in London's Chinatown district near Leicester Square 1 Leicester Street. However, the hotel went into administration in October 2012, and was sold and subsequently closed.

Diagnosis with Parkinson's disease and recognition
Henderson's stoic approach to Parkinson's disease, with which he was diagnosed in 1998, increased the regard in which he was held and he was appointed Member of the Order of the British Empire (MBE) in 2005. The same year he underwent innovative Deep Brain Stimulation which vastly improved his mobility.

He was appointed Officer of the Order of the British Empire (OBE) in the 2021 New Year Honours for services to the culinary arts.

Bibliography
1999 – Nose to Tail Eating: A Kind of British Cooking (Bloomsbury Publishing) 
2007 – Beyond Nose to Tail: A Kind of British Cooking: Part II (Bloomsbury Publishing) 
2012 – The Complete Nose to Tail: A Kind of British Cooking (Bloomsbury Publishing)

References

External links

St John restaurant
'On Authenticity', film by Christian Banfield

1963 births
Living people
English chefs
English restaurateurs
British cookbook writers
Businesspeople from London
20th-century English writers
21st-century English writers
Officers of the Order of the British Empire
People with Parkinson's disease
Writers from London